Katiola Airport is an airport serving Katiola in Côte d'Ivoire.

Airports in Ivory Coast
Buildings and structures in Vallée du Bandama District
Hambol